Bianca Bradey is an Australian actress who starred in Wyrmwood and its sequel Wyrmwood: Apocalypse.

Filmography
Films
Wrath (2011)
Wyrmwood (2014)
Perfect Fit (2016) - also co-writer
Rendel (2017)
Hear Me (2019) - also co-writer
Wyrmwood: Apocalypse (2021)

TV
Starting From … Now! (2014-2016)
Keihäsmatkat (2020)

References

External links
 

 
Living people
Australian film actresses
Australian television actresses